IUE may refer to:
International Ultraviolet Explorer
Indiana University East
Niue International Airport (IATA code)
International Union of Electrical Workers